Coconino High School (CHS) is a public secondary school located in Flagstaff, Arizona (US). It is part of the Flagstaff Unified School District and is one of the district's three high schools.

Located at 2801 North Izabel Street, Coconino High School serves students in grades nine through twelve and currently enrolls 1,446 students as of 2012.

The school's mascot is the panther.

History
The school first opened its doors in September 1967 to grades 10-12. The school's namesake is the name of the county in which it is located, Coconino County. The campus was designed by Guirey Srnka & Arnold. Construction was undertaken by Del E. Webb Corporation. Since its founding, the school building has been remodeled twice, once in 1977 and then again in 1989 (when FUSD added ninth graders to its high schools).

In the late 1960s the Kinlani Dormitory (now the Flagstaff Bordertown Dormitory), a Bureau of Indian Education-affiliated dormitory for Native American students, sent some of the boarders to Coconino High.

Neighborhoods served
Coconino High School serves east Flagstaff neighborhoods as well as a portion of the Navajo Nation. The school also serves the northern and eastern outlying suburbs and rural areas of Flagstaff, such as Doney Park and Winona.

Statistics

Coconino High School has a student to teacher ratio of 31.2 to 1. Eighty-two percent of the school's faculty has ten or more years of teaching experience.

Extracurricular activities

Athletics
Coconino High School also has a host of athletic teams such as (Men's) Football, (Men's and Women's) Basketball, (Men's and Women's) Soccer, (Women's) Volleyball, (Men's) Baseball, (Women's) Softball, (Men's and Women's) Tennis, (Men's and Women's) Cross Country/ Track and Field, Men's Wrestling, and (Men's) Golf. Coconino High School and Flagstaff High School have had a rivalry since the school opened. The two schools play each other in football at the City Championship game (located at Northern Arizona University's Walkup Skydome), which is the last game of the regular season for both schools.

Clubs
Coconino High School maintains a variety of clubs for students to participate in. Activities offered include the Coconino High School Student Council, SkillsUSA, Drama Club, Asian Cultural Club, the Coconino High School chapter of the National Honor Society, and the Native American Club. Coconino High School is also home to FRC Team 2486 the "CocoNuts" FIRST Robotics Team, the first and only FRC team in Flagstaff, AZ. They have garnered acclaim by qualifying for the FIRST Robotics World Championship Competition every year since their establishment in the 2007–08 school year. The school hosts an Army Junior ROTC battalion, which it picked up from the closed Sinagua High School.

Performing arts
CHS has many performing arts programs: Marching Band (during the football season)/ Symphonic Band (after football season), two-tiered Choir, Orchestra, and the Drama Club.

Band
The Coconino High School Band (both marching and concert) are award-winning; consistently receiving ratings: Superior to Superior with Distinction at marching band and symphonic band competitions over Arizona, Nevada, and California. In addition, many band members audition for the Northwest Region AMEA Honor Band, of which a majority are accepted. Of those, several students audition for the Arizona Music Educators Association All-State Honor Band.

Coconino Institute of Technology
The Coconino Institute of Technology (CIT) is a three-year-long accelerated science and technology program (sometimes accredited as a magnet school) within Coconino High School.

Students who enter the CIT program commit to attaining the following goals by graduation: achieving an ACT score of at least 29 or an SAT score of at least 1300 (Critical reading and mathematics sections), engaging in four years of career exploration through partnerships with current industry professionals and institutions of higher learning, completing at least five college or university applications, completing at least one scholarship application, and gaining acceptance into a college or university. The CIT curriculum allows students to complete all three major sciences required for Arizona public university admission at a pre-AP (honors) level within two years (Physics, Biology, and Chemistry). CIT students also complete an in-depth semester long project their senior fall semester on a topic of their choice.

Though CIT is a three-year program, students may choose to not continue. When a student does make this decision, they may not re-enter into the program.

Acceptance into CIT
Before entering high school, prospective students must apply; acceptance into CIT is based upon an entrance assessment (math), middle school GPA, teacher recommendations, and a writing sample completed at the time of testing. The entrance test is conducted every year in mid-April, however only incoming Freshmen may apply.

Current CIT three-year schedule
The CIT schedule is continuously evolving. This is the current four-year schedule for 2015 graduates.

Freshman year
 Pre-AP Physics
 Pre-AP Biology
 Pre-AP Engineering I

Sophomore year
 Pre-AP Chemistry
 Pre-AP Engineering II

Junior year
 Academic Symposium (spring semester) Research Project (fall semester)

Other
Coconino High School is also home to the 1999 National Science Teacher of the Year, David Thompson, who taught physics at Coconino High School while being a master teacher at the Center for Science Teaching and Learning (CTSL) at Northern Arizona University.

References

Schools in Coconino County, Arizona
Educational institutions established in 1967
Public high schools in Arizona
Magnet schools in Arizona
1967 establishments in Arizona